Jessica Cook "Jesse" Draper (born January 5, 1986) is an American venture capitalist and TV personality.

Early life
Draper is the daughter of Silicon Valley venture capitalist Timothy C. Draper and Melissa Lee ( Parker) Draper. Her paternal grandfather is William Henry Draper III, former Chairman of the Export–Import Bank of the United States and her great-grandfather was banker, general, and diplomat William Henry Draper Jr. who served as the first U.S. Ambassador to NATO. She is known for being a childhood friend of Theranos convicted fraudster Elizabeth Holmes and it was Draper's father, Timothy C. Draper, who provided Holmes with her first major investment for Theranos.

Career
Draper began her career as an actress. Her first notable role was on the Nickelodeon series The Naked Brothers Band, which starred her cousins Nat Wolff and Alex Wolff and was created by her aunt Polly Draper. She created a technology talk web show called The Valley Girl Show which she hosted, wrote, and produced with Jonathan Polenz. She attended UCLA. In May 2014, Draper signed a distribution deal with Cox Media Group to broadcast her talk show, The Valley Girl Show, in Northern California and Seattle.

Venture capitalist
In 2015, Draper founded Halogen Ventures to invest in female founded companies. She has invested in 70 companies and had 10 exits.

Personal life
On June 15, 2013 Draper married accountant Brian MacInnes.

Filmography

References

External links

1986 births
20th-century American actresses
21st-century American actresses
American Internet celebrities
American film actresses
American television actresses
American television reporters and correspondents
Living people
Place of birth missing (living people)
University of California, Los Angeles alumni
American women television journalists
Draper family